Budeč is a municipality and village in Jindřichův Hradec District in the South Bohemian Region of the Czech Republic. It has about 200 inhabitants.

Administrative parts
The village of Borová is an administrative part of Budeč.

References

External links

Villages in Jindřichův Hradec District